Saint Petersburg (in Persian: سن پطرزبورگ) is a 2010 Iranian comedy film directed by Behrouz Afkhami. Mohsen Tanabandeh,  Peyman Ghassemkhani, Bahareh Rahnama, Shila Khodadad, Amin Hayai, Sajad Afsharian , Soroush Sehhat and Andisheh Fooladvand were among the actors and Peiman Ghasemkhani wrote the screenplay
The film deals with the relation of a robber with the last tsar family of Romanovs.

Plot 
The two criminals are informed of the existence of a treasure with the key of a double-headed eagle, which is the legacy of the Russian Tsar. Both encounter events in their quest for treasure...

Cast 
Mohsen Tanabandeh
Peyman Ghasemkhani
Bahareh Rahnama
Shila Khodadad
Amin Hayai
Soroush Sehhat
Andisheh Fooladvand
Omid Roohani
Naeimeh Nezamdoost
Sajad Afsharian
Ardeshir Kazemi
Babak Borzouyeh
Majid Shahryari
Ali Asghar Tabasi
Ebrahim Bahrololoumi
Yousef Ghorbani
Arash Taj

References

External links 

Iranian comedy films
2010 films
2010 comedy films
2010s Persian-language films
2010s heist films
Treasure hunt films